On the Road to Mandalay is a song by Oley Speaks (1874–1948) with text by Rudyard Kipling (1865–1936).

Text 

Oley Speaks set to music a portion of Kipling's poem, Mandalay, 1890, from Barrack-Room Ballads, and Other Verses, published in 1892 and 1896. The song comprises three verses of Kipling's poem: the first, second and sixth. The text of the song is a first person description by a British soldier in 19th-century Burma, who has returned to Britain. He describes his romance with a "Burma girl" and speaks of the emotional pull he experiences to return to Mandalay.

Music 

On the Road to Mandalay was published as a piano/vocal song in 1907 by the John Church Company and dedicated to Frank Croxton. The tempo is marked alla marcia and the music set in common time. The song changes tonality as each of the three verses reaches the chorus, shifting dramatically from minor to major. Originally published in the key of C and marked Low Voice, the style is described as Romantic. Composition features marked use of fermate and wide dynamic range, from pianissimo to fortissimo. Occasionally the second verse is cut, but the complete song averages four minutes in duration. Published originally for voice and piano, orchestral arrangements exist.

Recording history 

"On the Road to Mandalay" was well poised historically to become a frequently recorded song. In 1907,  the sheet music experienced great popularity and sold more than a million copies. An early recording was made by Frank Croxton, to whom the song was dedicated, in 1913. Famous baritone singers have recorded the song, from operatic artists, such as Lawrence Tibbett, Leonard Warren and Thomas Hampson, and concert artists, such as Peter Dawson, to more popular singers such as Nelson Eddy and Frankie Laine, and even Frank Sinatra, who sang a jazzy, controversial arrangement in which elements of the Kipling text were changed (notably Temple-bells becoming crazy bells), included in his album Come Fly with Me. Bing Crosby included the song in a medley on his album Join Bing and Sing Along (1960).

Rudyard Kipling's daughter, Elsie Bambridge, so disliked Sinatra's lyrical improvisations and jazzy arrangement of the song that she exercised her authority as executrix of Kipling's estate to have the song banned for some years in the U.K.

Notes 

American songs
Songs about roads
1907 songs
Songs with music by Oley Speaks
Adaptations of works by Rudyard Kipling